Trymalitis scalifera is a species of moth of the family Tortricidae. It is found in Ethiopia, La Réunion, Madagascar, South Africa and Tanzania.

References

Moths described in 1912
Chlidanotini
Moths of Madagascar
Lepidoptera of Tanzania
Moths of Réunion
Moths of Sub-Saharan Africa
Lepidoptera of South Africa